Magomed Arsenovich Kurbanov (born 11 April 1992) is a Ukrainian-born Russian-Azerbaijani former professional football player.

Career

Club
He made his debut in the Russian Premier League on 7 December 2012 for FC Rostov in a game against FC Krasnodar.

On 31 January 2014, Kurbanov signed a two-year contract with Sumgayit FK in the Azerbaijan Premier League.

On 11 October 2017, Kurbanov signed for Kapaz PFK until the end of the 2017–18 season, but left the club at his request on 2 January 2018. On 6 February 2018, Kurbanov signed for Sabah FK.

International career
Kurbanov made his debut for the Azerbaijan U21 national team on 9 September 2014 against Portugal, coming on as an 86th-minute substitute for Agabala Ramazanov.

Career statistics

Club

International

Statistics accurate as of match played 3 September 2015

References

External links
 
 

1992 births
Living people
Azerbaijani footballers
Russian footballers
Azerbaijani expatriate footballers
FC Rostov players
FC Taganrog players
Sumgayit FK players
Kapaz PFK players
Russian Premier League players
Azerbaijan Premier League players
Association football midfielders
Sabah FC (Azerbaijan) players
Neftçi PFK players
Azerbaijan youth international footballers
Azerbaijan under-21 international footballers
Azerbaijan international footballers